David Michael Bennett (5 March 1939 – November 2009) was an English professional footballer who played for Arsenal, Portsmouth, Southampton, Bournemouth and Guildford City, as a winger.

References

1939 births
2009 deaths
English footballers
Arsenal F.C. players
Portsmouth F.C. players
Southampton F.C. players
AFC Bournemouth players
Guildford City F.C. players
English Football League players
Association football wingers